Boisemont is the name of several communes in France:

 Boisemont, Eure
 Boisemont, Val-d'Oise